Yomif Kejelcha Atomsa (born 1 August 1997) is an Ethiopian distance runner. He won the silver medal in the 10,000 metres at the 2019 World Athletics Championships and gold medals for the 3000 metres at the 2016 and 2018 World Indoor Championships. Kejelcha is the world indoor record holder for the mile with a time of 3:47.01, set on 3 March 2019 in Boston.

He was the 2013 World Youth 3000 m champion and 2014 World Junior 5000 m gold medallist.

Career
Yomif Kejelcha made his international debut at the 2013 World Youth Championships in Donetsk, winning gold in the boys' 3000 metres with a time of 7:53.56.

In June 2014, he placed second over 3000 m in 7:36.28 at the Ostrava Golden Spike elite meeting, losing only to Kenya's Caleb Ndiku; he defeated 2008 Olympic medallist Nick Willis and former world champion Bernard Lagat. Yomif won the 5000 metres at the World Junior Championships held in July in Eugene, Oregon that year, running 13:25.19. He also won gold in the 3000 m at the Youth Olympic Games in Nanjing later that summer. He finished 2014 as the world youth leader at both the 3000 and 5000 metres, and world junior leader at 3000 metres.

Yomif opened his 2015 season at the African Junior Championships in Addis Ababa, winning the 5000 m in a time of 14:31.03. He made his IAAF Diamond League debut in Doha, placing fifth in the 3000 m. He then won a non-Diamond Race 5000 m event at the Prefontaine Classic in Eugene, improving his personal best to 13:10.54 and outkicking Edwin Soi and Galen Rupp. Yomif scored his first Diamond League victory the following week at the Golden Gala in Rome, winning 5000 m in a world-leading 12:58.39 and breaking 13 minutes for the first time. On 11 September 2015, Kejelcha competed in the event at the Brussels Diamond League, setting a new personal best and world-leading time of 12:53.98.

He started 2016 by winning the gold in the 3000 metres at the World Indoor Championships in Portland, Oregon. On 27 August, Kejelcha won the event at the Diamond League Paris meet in a new world U20 record of 7:28.19.

At the European Athletics Outdoor Classic Permit Meeting in Sweden on 18 August 2018, Kejelcha won the 3000 m with a time of 7:28.00. On 31 August, he placed third in the 5000 m at the Diamond League Brussels Final. He ran a personal best of 12:46.79, making him the seventh-fastest runner ever in the event.

Kejelcha came within hundredth of a second of Hicham El Guerrouj's world indoor mile record on 9 February 2019 at the Millrose Games. He ran an Ethiopian national record and a Millrose meet record of 3:48.46, making him second-fastest athlete of all time in the event. On 3 March, Kejelcha broke the record with a time of 3:47.01, slicing 1.44 seconds off El Guerrouj's mark set in 1997. He came short of the 1500 metres world indoor record with his 3:31.25 split en route, making him the third-fastest indoor performer in history though. He was paced by Erik Sowinski, Christian Harrison, and Harun Abda.

Kejelcha won the silver medal for the 10,000 metres at the 2019 World Athletics Championships held in Doha, Qatar, finished eighth in the event at the delayed 2020 Tokyo Olympics in 2021, and placed also eighth in the 1500 m at the 2022 World Athletics Championships in Eugene, Oregon.

On 19 March 2023, he missed Berihu Aregawi's 5 kilometres world record of 12:49 by just one second in Lille, France to move up to second on the world all-time list.

Achievements

All information from World Athletics profile.

International competitions

Personal bests
 1500 metres – 3:32.59 (Zagreb 2018)
 1500 metres indoor – 3:31.25 (Boston, MA 2019) 4th athlete all time
 One mile – 3:58.24 (Stanford, CA 2019)
 One mile indoor – 3:47.01 (Boston, MA 2019) World record
 2000 metres indoor – 4:57.74 (Metz 2014) 
 3000 metres – 7:26.25	(Oslo 2021)
 3000 metres indoor – 7:38.67 (Karlsruhe 2018)
 5000 metres – 12:46.79 (Brussels 2018)
 10,000 metres – 26:49.34 (Doha 2019)
Road
 5 kilometres – 12:50 (Lille 2023) 2nd all time
 10 kilometres – 28:13 (Rennes 2013)
 Half marathon – 58:32 (Valencia 2022)

Circuit win and titles
 Diamond League Overall 5000m Diamond Race Title: 2015
 2015 (3) (5000m): Eugene Prefontaine Classic, Rome Golden Gala, Brussels Memorial Van Damme (WL)
 2016 (1) (3000m): Paris Meeting ( WL)
 2018 (1) (3000m): Rabat Mohammed VI Meeting International (WL )
 2019 (2) (5000m): Shanghai IAAF Diamond League (WL), Lausanne Athletissima
 2021 (1) (3000m): Oslo Bislett Games ( WL )

References

External links

 

1997 births
Living people
Ethiopian male long-distance runners
Ethiopian male middle-distance runners
Athletes (track and field) at the 2014 Summer Youth Olympics
World Athletics Championships athletes for Ethiopia
World Athletics Championships medalists
Sportspeople from Oromia Region
World Athletics Indoor Championships winners
Diamond League winners
Youth Olympic gold medalists for Ethiopia
Youth Olympic gold medalists in athletics (track and field)
Athletes (track and field) at the 2020 Summer Olympics
Olympic athletes of Ethiopia
21st-century Ethiopian people